Two Sinners is a 1935 film directed by Arthur Lubin.

Plot
In London, Henry Vane gets out of prison after serving fifteen years for murder and tries to rebuild his life.

Cast
Otto Kruger as Henry Vane
Martha Sleeper as Elsie Summerstone
Minna Gombell as Claudine Pym
Ferdinand Munier as Monte Alabaster
Cora Sue Collins as Sally Pym
Margaret Seddon as Mrs. Summerstone
Harrington Reynolds as Major Ritchie
Fred Walton as Shepley
Olaf Hytten as French judge
Montague Shaw as Humphrey Grylls
William P. Carleton as Heggie
Harold Entwistle as Pateman

Production
The working title of Two Sinners was Two Black Sheep, the title of the 1933 Warwick Deeping novel on which it was based. The novel had become a best seller.  In May 1935, Republic announced they would make a film of the novel. The same month, Arthur Lubin signed a contract with Republic for a year to make six pictures starting with the book Two Black Sheep that became the film Two Sinners.

Otto Kruger was cast in July 1935.

Release
Two Sinners was released as a second feature in some U.S. theaters alongside the Kay Francis vehicle The Goose and the Gander.

The film impressed the holders of the rights to a W.W. Jacobs story which persuaded them to sell it to Lubin years later to make Footsteps in the Fog.

References

External links
 

Two Sinners at BFI
Review of film at Variety

1935 films
1930s romantic comedy-drama films
American black-and-white films
1930s English-language films
Monogram Pictures films
Films based on British novels
Films set in France
Films set in London
Films directed by Arthur Lubin
American romantic comedy-drama films
1935 comedy films
1935 drama films
1930s American films